The Quiet War is a 2008 science fiction novel written by Paul McAuley. It was initially published by Gollancz on 16 October 2008. The novel was an Arthur C. Clarke Award Nominee in 2009.

Summary
The Quiet War is a space opera set in the 23rd Century. Some of the Earth's population has fled the planet due to war and catastrophic climate change. In the aftermath of climatic disaster and massive loss of life, humanity has consolidated into three superpowers that control the planet.

The population that fled the planet initially colonized the Moon and Mars, but these colonies were destroyed by hostile forces from Earth. The pioneers—or "Outers" as they came to be known—eventually settled among Jupiter's moons Callisto, Europa, and Ganymede, and Saturn's moons Dione, Enceladus, and Mimas. The Outers have survived by using highly advanced genetic engineering and their pure determination for a free life. They have formed a loose form of democracy which over the course of centuries has been dominated by long-lived humans who still remember the events which caused them to flee Earth.

The Earthly superpowers have struggled to rebuild the planet. The most powerful and aggressive superpower is Greater Brazil, a nation controlling both South America and the remains of North America.  North America has been devastated by climate change, which caused the destruction of civilization there, with few cities left populated. Greater Brazil has taken over this desert continent and forced the population to live by their "green" politics whereby most of the population live in cities while the open land is being restored to a pristine natural state.

Greater Brazil is a corrupt state run by a handful of powerful families; it is anti-democratic and culturally conservative. It is semi-feudal; people who are not related to the ruling families by blood or marriage are essentially like medieval serfs. Greater Brazil is threatened by the very existence of the democratic and technologically dynamic Outer colonies, while at the same time greedy for the benefits of Outer technology. Genetic engineering is a particularly touchy subject for Greater Brazil, which interprets extensive "cutting", as they call it, to be against their green political and religious philosophies. For all of these reasons, Greater Brazil wishes to subdue the Outers and bring them under their control.

The novel follows the lives of a small set of individuals, all of them from Greater Brazil, who become caught up in the events set in motion by Greater Brazil's designs for the Outer colonies. These central characters include an arrogant but brilliant "gene wizard"; a space fighter pilot to whom the gene wizard gives extraordinary powers; a cloned assassin designed by the gene wizard to infiltrate the Outers; a soil biologist who is recruited for a joint Earth-Outer goodwill project; and an unprincipled, ambitious weasel of a man who does his superiors' dirty work.

The events of the novel were followed up in 2009 with McAuley's Gardens of the Sun.

Critical notes
Eric Brown of The Guardian noted "Few writers conjure futures as convincingly as McAuley: his latest novel deftly combines bold characterisation, a thorough understanding of political complexity, and excellent science - in this case the biology of terraforming. It's the 23rd century and humanity has split into two competing blocs: the citizens of Earth, ruled by a few powerful families, and the Outers, the descendants of dissidents who fled the repressive regimes of Earth and settled on the moons of Jupiter and Saturn. After a slow start, the novel picks up pace to present a future that is wondrous yet marred by human frailty". 

Abigail Nussbaum of Strange Horizons wrote "between the flatness of its narrative and the predictability of its characters, there's not much to feel passionate about in The Quiet War, and for the first part in a series this may be a fatal flaw. The novel is undercut by not amounting to a single story—it ends as the war ends, but with the solar system still in turmoil, the political situation and ultimate disposition of Earth and the Outer colonies still unclear, and our characters hanging in limbo. On the other hand, the novel's ending isn't nearly open-ended enough to create the suspense that'll whet its readers' appetite for the next installment, and since the story itself is not much more than enjoyable, I for one don't feel any compulsion to read the next chapter. ".

References

External links

2008 science fiction novels
2008 British novels
British science fiction novels
Fiction set on Callisto (moon)
Fiction set on Dione (moon)
Dystopian novels
Enceladus
Fiction set on Europa (moon)
Fiction set on Ganymede (moon)
Hard science fiction
Fiction set on Jupiter's moons
Novels set in Brazil
Fiction set on Mimas (moon)
Novels set in the 23rd century
Fiction set on Saturn's moons
Space opera novels
Works by Paul J. McAuley
Novels set in fictional wars
Victor Gollancz Ltd books